The Téméraire-class ships of the line were a class of a hundred and twenty 74-gun ships of the line ordered between 1782 and 1813 for the French navy or its attached navies in dependent (French-occupied) territories. Although a few of these were cancelled, the type was and remains the most numerous class of capital ship ever built to a single design.

The class was designed by Jacques-Noël Sané in 1782 as a development of the Annibal and her near-sister Northumberland, both of which had been designed by him and built at Brest during the 1777-1780 period. Some thirteen ships were ordered and built to this new design from 1782 to 1785, and then the same design was adopted as a standard for all subsequent 74-gun ships (the most common type of ship of the line throughout the period from ca. 1750 to 1830) built for the French Navy during the next three decades as part of the fleet expansion programme instituted by Jean-Charles de Borda in 1786.

Variants from basic design
While all the French 74-gun ships from the mid-1780s until the close of the Napoleonic Wars were to the Téméraire design, there were three variants of the basic design which Sané developed with the same hull form of Téméraire. In 1793 two ships were laid down at Brest to an enlarged design; in 1801 two ships were commenced at Lorient with a slightly shorter length than the standard design (with a third ship commenced at Brest but never completed); and in 1803 two ships were commenced at Toulon to a smaller version (many more ships to this 'small(er) model' were then built in the shipyards controlled by France in Italy and the Netherlands) - these are detailed separately below.

Ships in class

Téméraire group (18 ships) 
 
Builder: Brest shipyard
Ordered: 15 February 1782
Laid down: May 1782
Launched: 17 December 1782
Completed: July 1783
Fate: Condemned, November 1801. Broken up, 1803.
 
Builder: Lorient shipyard
Ordered: 15 February 1782
Laid down: July 1782
Launched: 28 October 1784
Completed: 1785
Fate: Condemned, November 1802. Broken up, 1803.
 
Builder: Brest shipyard
Ordered: 15 February 1782
Laid down: July 1782
Launched: 11 November 1784
Completed: 1785
Fate: Wrecked off Brest, 30 January 1795.
 
Builder: Rochefort shipyard
Ordered: 15 February 1782
Laid down: July 1782
Launched: 21 June 1785
Completed: October 1785
Fate: Captured by the Royal Navy at Toulon in August 1793, but retaken by the French in December 1793; captured again by the Royal Navy in February 1800 and served as HMS Généreux. Broken up in 1816.
 , renamed Bonnet Rouge in January 1794 and then Timoléon in February 1794.
Builder: Toulon shipyard
Ordered: 1784
Laid down: September 1784
Launched: 15 September 1785
Completed: 1786 or 1787
Fate: Destroyed in action at the Battle of the Nile, August 1798.
 , renamed Phocion in October 1792.
Builder: Brest shipyard
Ordered: 1784
Laid down: December 1784
Launched: 16 September 1785
Completed: 1786
Fate: Surrendered to Spain by her officers at Trinidad in January 1793.
 
Builder: Lorient shipyard
Ordered: 1782
Laid down: August 1782, but work stopped in February 1783 and she was demolished.
Re-laid down: November 1784
Launched: 19 September 1785
Completed: late 1785
Fate: Captured by the Royal Navy at Trafalgar on 21 October 1805, and subsequently wrecked.
 
Builder: Brest shipyard
Ordered: 1784
Laid down: September 1784
Launched: 3 October 1785
Completed: April 1786
Fate: Condemned in May 1820 and became Pontoon No.4 in April 1821. Broken up at Rochefort in late 1832.
 , renamed Lys in July 1786 and then Tricolore in October 1792.
Builder: Toulon shipyard
Ordered: 1784
Laid down: September 1784
Launched: 7 October 1785
Completed: September 1787
Fate: Captured by the Royal Navy at Toulon in August 1793, then destroyed during the Siege of Toulon in December 1793.
 , renamed Ça Ira in April 1794 and then Agricola in June 1794.
Builder: Lorient shipyard
Ordered: 1784
Laid down: January 1783, but work stopped in February 1783 and she was demolished.
Re-laid down: November 1784
Launched: 17 November 1785
Completed: August 1787
Fate: Broken up at Rochefort, 1803.
 , renamed Mucius Scaevola in November 1793, then Mucius in same month.
Builder: Rochefort shipyard
Ordered: 1782
Laid down: October 1784
Launched: 18 April 1787
Completed: 1788
Fate: Condemned 1802, and broken up 1803-04.
 
Builder: Brest shipyard
Ordered: 1785
Begun: October 1785
Launched: 22 June 1787
Completed: July 1787
Fate: Wrecked and then burnt, February 1793.
 
Builder: Lorient shipyard
Ordered:
Begun: May 1786
Launched: 11 October 1787
Completed: 1788
Fate: Broken up, 1803.
 
Builder: Rochefort shipyard
Ordered:
Begun: July 1786
Launched: 25 October 1787
Completed: 1788
Fate: Captured by the Royal Navy, 1 June 1794. Accidentally destroyed by fire, 24 August 1794.
 , renamed Gasparin in February 1794, reverted to Apollon in May 1794; renamed Marceau in December 1797.
Builder: Rochefort shipyard
Ordered:
Begun: April 1787
Launched: 21 May 1788
Completed: 1788
Fate: Broken up, 1798.
 
Builder: Brest shipyard
Ordered:
Begun: end 1786
Launched: 21 May 1788
Completed: 1789
Fate: Captured by the Royal Navy, 1 June 1794, and served as HMS Impétueux. Broken up, 1813.
 
Builder: Brest shipyard
Ordered:
Begun: End 1786
Launched: 30 October 1788
Completed: July 1790
Fate: Destroyed during the Siege of Toulon, December 1793.
 
Builder: Rochefort shipyard
Ordered:
Begun: September 1787
Launched: 8 June 1789
Completed: June 1790
Fate: Captured by Britain during the Battle of the Nile on 2 August 1798. Served as HMS Aboukir until broken up in Plymouth in 1802.

Duquesne group (46 ships) 
 
Builder: Toulon shipyard
Ordered:
Begun: August 1787
Launched: 2 September 1788
Completed: 1789
Fate: Captured by the Royal Navy on 24 July 1803, and served as HMS Duquesne. Broken up in 1805.
 
Builder: Lorient shipyard
Ordered:
Begun: June 1787
Launched: 16 December 1788
Completed: July 1790
Decommissioned: 26 October 1833
Fate: Broken up at Brest, 1841.
 
Builder: Lorient shipyard
Ordered:
Begun: June 1787
Launched: 15 November 1789
Completed: August 1790
Fate: Broken up in Baltimore, 1816.
 , renamed Montagnard in March 1794, Démocrate on 18 May 1795, then back to Jupiter again on 30 May 1795, and to Batave in December 1797.
Builder: Brest shipyard
Ordered: 19 August 1787
Begun: June 1788
Launched: 4 November 1789
Completed: October 1790
Fate:  Broken up in Brest, 1807.
 
Builder: Brest shipyard
Ordered:
Begun: 23 May 1788
Launched: 16 December 1789
Completed: August 1790
Fate: Ran aground, 12 December 1792. Abandoned, and finally sank, 8 June 1793.
 
Builder: Lorient shipyard
Ordered:
Launched: 7 November 1790
Fate: Wrecked at the Battle of the Basque Roads on 26 February 1809, hull burnt by the British in April.
 
Builder: Toulon shipyard
Ordered:
Launched: 30 July 1790
Fate: Captured by the British at Toulon in August 1793, commissioned with a crew of French Royalist rebels under British command, burnt by accident at Livorno on 28 November 1793.
 , renamed Révolution on 7 January 1793, then Finisterre on 5 February 1803.
Builder: Rochefort shipyard
Ordered:
Launched: 14 April 1790
Fate: Broken up, 1816.
 , renamed Mont-Blanc in 1793, and Trente-et-un Mai in 1794. Renamed Républicain in 1795, then Mont-Blanc again in 1796.
Builder: Rochefort shipyard
Ordered:
Launched:13 August 1791
Fate: Captured by the Royal Navy during the Battle of Cape Ortegal, 4 November 1805. Served as HMS Mont Blanc. Used as a gunpowder hulk from 1811, and sold in 1819.
 , renamed Redoutable, May 1795.
Builder: Brest shipyard
Ordered:
Launched: 31 May 1791
Fate: Participated in the Battle of Trafalgar, taken by the British, foundered two days later, 22 October 1805.
 
Builder: Lorient shipyard
Ordered:
Launched: 12 September 1791
Fate: Burnt by the Royal Navy at the Siege of Toulon, 18 December 1793.
 , renamed Gaulois.
Builder: Lorient shipyard
Ordered:
Launched: 24 January 1792
Fate: Decommissioned, June 1802. Broken up, 1805.
 , renamed Cisalpin in 1797, and Aquilon in 1803.
Builder: Brest
Ordered:
Launched: 22 July 1793
Fate: Grounded and burnt at the Battle of the Basque Roads, April 1809
 
Builder: Toulon shipyard
Ordered:
Launched:28 May 1791
Fate: Captured at Toulon by the Royal Navy, 29 August 1793. Served as HMS Pompee. Converted to prison hulk at Portsmouth, 1816. Broken up, January 1817.
 
Builder: Brest
Ordered:
Launched: 8 May 1793
Fate: Captured by the Royal Navy during the Battle of Groix, 23 June 1795. Served as HMS Tigre. Broken up, June 1817.
 , renamed Desaix in August 1800.
Builder: Lorient
Ordered:
Launched: 28 June 1793
Fate: Wrecked at Saint-Domingue, January 1802.
 , renamed Pégase in 1795, and Hoche in 1797.
Builder:
Ordered:
Launched: 23 March 1794
Fate: Captured by the Royal Navy on 12 October 1798. Served as HMS Donegal. Broken up, 1845.

 
Builder: Lorient shipyard
Ordered:
Launched: 29 May 1794
Fate: Driven ashore by HMS Amazon and Indefatigable and wrecked on 14 January 1797.
 
Builder: Rochefort
Ordered:
Launched: 22 January 1794
Fate: Decommissioned, May 1820.
 , renamed Marat in 1794, Formidable in May 1795.
Builder: Rochefort shipyard
Ordered:
Launched: 29 April 1794
Broken up in 1814.
 
Builder: Lorient
Ordered: 3 July 1793
Launched: 8 October 1794
Fate: Scrapped, 1808.
 , renamed Dix-août in 1798, Brave in February 1803.
Builder: Lorient
Ordered: 16 February 1793
Launched: 2 May 1795
Fate: Captured by  during the Battle of San Domingo, 6 February 1806. Foundered, 12 April 1806.
 , renamed Marengo on 2 December 1802.
Builder: Toulon
Ordered:
Launched: 21 July 1795
Fate: Captured by the Royal Navy in the action of 13 March 1806, and served as HMS Marengo until broken up 1816.
 , renamed Voltaire in 1795, Constitution in 1795, and Jupiter in 1803.
Builder: Lorient
Ordered:
Launched: 28 September 1795
Fate: Captured by the Royal Navy during the Battle of San Domingo, 6 February 1806, and served as HMS Maida. Sold for breaking up, 1814.

 
Builder: Lorient
Ordered:
Launched: 5 October 1797
Fate: Captured by  during the Battle of the Raz de Sein on 21 April 1798, and served as HMS Hercules. Broken up in December 1810.
 
Builder: Toulon
Ordered:
Launched: 24 November 1797
Fate: Captured by the Royal Navy during the Battle of the Nile, 2 August 1798. Served as HMS Spartiate. Broken up, 1857.
 
Builder: Lorient
Ordered:
Launched: 22 December 1798
Fate: Exchanged with Spain, 1806.
 
Builder: Lorient
Ordered:
Launched: 1 February 1798
Fate: Destroyed by accidental fire before being commissioned.
 , launched as Brutus and renamed before completion
Builder: Lorient
Ordered: 31 May 1798
Begun: August 1798
Launched: 24 January 1803
Completed: March 1803
Fate: Beached and set ablaze by the British in the Chesapeake, 14 September 1806.
 , renamed Diomède in 1803.
Builder: Lorient
Ordered:
Launched: 1 August 1799
Fate: Ran aground and wrecked during the Battle of San Domingo, 6 February 1806. Burnt by the Royal Navy, 8 February 1806.
 
Builder: Rochefort
Ordered:
Launched: 6 July 1800
Fate: Captured by the Royal Navy at Trafalgar on 21 October 1805. Retaken by her crew on 22 October 1805, but sank in a heavy storm the next day.
  (ii)
Builder: Rochefort
Ordered:
Launched: 24 March 1800
Fate: Captured by the Royal Navy in the Battle of Cape Ortegal, 4 November 1805, and served as HMS Implacable. Renamed HMS Foudroyant, 1943. Scuttled, 2 December 1949.
 
Builder: Rochefort
Ordered:
Launched: 10 May 1801
Fate: Captured by Spain at Cadiz, June 1808.
  (ii)
Builder: Lorient
Ordered:
Launched: 29 March 1801
Fate: Captured by the Royal Navy at the Battle of Cape Ortegal, 4 November 1805. Served as HMS Scipion until broken up in January 1819.
 
Builder: Rochefort
Ordered:
Launched: 18 August 1803
Fate: Decommissioned, 1816.
 
Builder: Rochefort
Ordered:
Launched: 17 November 1804
Fate: Sunk at the battle of Trafalgar, 22 October 1805.
 
Builder: Rochefort
Ordered:
Launched: 12 January 1804
Fate: Ran aground and burnt, 26 October 1809.
 
Builder: Lorient
Ordered:
Launched: 12 April 1805
Fate: Burnt by crew to avoid capture, 7 April 1814.
 
Builder: Rochefort
Ordered:
Launched: 17 June 1806
Fate: Decommissioned, 1816.
 
Builder: Lorient
Ordered:
Launched: 3 February 1806
Fate: Broken up, 1831.
 
Builder: Lorient
Ordered:
Launched: 2 September 1807
Fate: Captured by the Royal Navy on 17 April 1809 during Troude's expedition to the Caribbean. Served as HMS Abercrombie. Sold, 1817.

Danube Group (26 ships) 
 , renamed Lys in April 1814, reverted to Polonais from March until July 1815, then Lys again.
Builder: Lorient
Ordered:
Begun: August 1805
Launched: 27 May 1808
Completed: October 1808
Fate: Broken up at Brest, 1825.
 , renamed, Quatorze Juillet in 1795, but launched under her original name.
Builder: Brest
Ordered:
Begun: 16 April 1794
Launched: 9 June 1808
Completed: September 1808
Fate: Wrecked during the Battle of the Basque Roads on 12 April 1809, and burned by her crew to avoid capture.

 
Builder: Rochefort
Ordered:
Launched: 31 March 1809
Fate: Converted to a pontoon, 1828.
 
Builder: Toulon
Ordered:
Begun: June 1807
Launched: 21 December 1808
Completed: August 1809
Fate: Converted to a pontoon, 1828.
 
Builder: Rochefort
Ordered:
Launched: 25 May 1809
Fate: Converted to a pontoon, 1822.
 
Builder: Lorient 
Ordered:
Launched: 8 December 1809
Fate: Wrecked off Brest, 23 March 1814.
  (ii)
Builder: Brest
Ordered:
Launched: 21 May 1810
Fate: Struck, 1849
 , renamed Pluton in 1866.
Builder: Lorient
Ordered:
Launched: 12 October 1810
Fate: Struck, 21 July 1858. Prison hulk from 1860 to 1865. Broken up in 1873.
 
Builder: Toulon
Ordered:
Launched: 9 June 1811
Fate: Struck, 24 November 1857. Used as a barracks hulk from 1857 to 1869. Broken up in 1879.
 
Builder: Antwerp
Ordered:
Launched: 15 August 1811
Fate: Struck, 1826.
 , razeed and renamed Amphitrite in 1823.
Builder: Genoa
Ordered:
Launched: 23 February 1812
Fate: Converted to a pontoon, 1836.
 
Builder: Antwerp
Ordered:
Launched: 14 April 1812
Fate: Converted to a pontoon, 1826. Broken up, 1831.
 , razeed and renamed Guerrière in 1821.
Builder: Toulon
Ordered:
Launched: 31 May 1812
Fate: Broken up, 1840.
 
Builder: Toulon
Ordered:
Launched: 15 August 1812
Fate: Struck, 22 June 1858, and used as a barracks hulk. Broken up in Toulon, 1877.
  (iii)
Builder: Genoa
Ordered:
Launched: 5 September 1813
Fate: Struck, 1846.
  (ii)
Builder: Brest
Ordered:
Launched: 9 October 1813
Fate: Scrapped, 1841.
  (ii)
Builder: Cherbourg
Ordered:
Launched: 10 November 1813
Fate: Struck, and used as a floating magazine from 1824.
 , razeed and renamed Pallas in 1821.
Builder: Toulon
Ordered:
Launched: 5 December 1813
Fate: Struck, 1831. Broken up, 1840.
  (ii)
Builder: Antwerp
Ordered:
Begun: December 1808
Launched: 5 July 1814
Completed: September 1814
Fate: Lost, 1833.
 
Builder: Genoa
Ordered:
Begun: February 1812. Captured by the British, 18 April 1814.
Launched: 18 April 1815 for the British Navy as HMS Genoa
Completed: 1815
Fate: Broken up at Plymouth, 1838.
  (ii), renamed Provence in July 1815, then Alger in July 1830.
Builder: Toulon
Ordered:
Begun: September 1812
Launched: 26 May 1815
Completed: August 1815
Fate: Struck, 31 December 1855, and used as a hospital ship. Broken up, 1881.
 , renamed Glorieux before launch, Minerve in 1834, Aber Wrac'h in 1865.
Builder: Rochefort
Ordered:
Begun: January 1812
Launched: 18 June 1818
Completed: July 1818
Fate: Razeed to 58-gun frigate during 1831-34. Struck, and converted to a pontoon, 1853. Broken up, 1874.
  (ii)
Builder: Lorient-Caudan
Ordered:
Begun: July 1811
Launched: 25 August 1820
Completed: December 1820
Fate: Broken up, 1833
 
Builder: Rochefort
Ordered:
Begun: April 1813
Launched: 22 September 1823
Completed: December 1824
Fate: Converted to a pontoon, 1852. Broken up, 1870.
  (ii), renamed Duperré in December 1849.
Builder: Brest
Ordered:
Begun: October 1813
Launched: 26 August 1824
Completed: 1825
Fate: Broken up, 1870.
  (ii)
Builder: Cherbourg
Ordered:
Begun: July 1813
Launched: 23 September 1831
Completed: 1832
Fate: Broken up, 1865.

Three further ships to this design were begun at Castellammare di Stabia for the "puppet" Neapolitan Navy of Joachim Murat:
 
Begun: end 1808
Launched: 21 August 1810
Completed: January 1812
Fate: Out of service 1847, and broken up.
 
Begun: September 1810
Launched: 1 August 1812
Completed: May 1813
Fate: Damaged by fire, 10 May 1820. Sold for breaking up, 1821.
 The third ship, laid down in September 1812, was never named, let alone launched, as its construction was abandoned following the defection of the Kingdom of Naples from the Napoleonic cause in November 1813.

Large Variant (Cassard group – 2 ships launched) 
Two ships were laid down in 1793–1794 at Brest to a variant of Sané's design with the aim of carrying 24-pounder guns on the upper deck instead of the 18-pounders carried by the Téméraire. These ships were two feet longer than the standard 74s, and half a foot wider. The first was begun as the Lion, but was renamed Glorieux in 1795 and Cassard in 1798. The second was begun as the Magnanime, but was renamed Quatorze Juillet in 1798 and Vétéran in 1802. Unlike the main sequence, construction proceeded slowly. By 1816 the 24-pounders aboard these two ships had been replaced by 18-pounders, and no further ships to this variant design were produced, so indicating that it was not judged successful.
 
Builder: Brest shipyard
Begun: November 1794
Launched: 18 July 1803
Completed: December 1803
Fate: Condemned, 1833.
 
Builder: Brest shipyard
Begun: August 1793
Launched: 24 September 1803
Completed: December 1803
Fate: Condemned, 1818.

Short Variant (Suffren group – 2 ships launched) 
Two ships were begun in 1801 to a variation of the standard Téméraire design by Sané to meet the demands of Pierre-Alexandre Forfait. The length of these ships were reduced by 65 cm from the standard design. A third ship to this variant design begun at Brest was cancelled in 1804. After Forfait left the Ministry of the Marine in October 1801, no further vessels were ordered to this variant design.
 
Builder: Lorient shipyard
Begun: August 1801
Launched: 17 September 1803
Completed: October 1803
Fate: Condemned, 1815.
 
Builder: Lorient shipyard
Begun: August 1801
Launched: 8 July 1804
Completed: September 1804
Fate: Captured by the British at Trafalgar in 1805, but retaken. Captured by Spain at Cadiz, June 1808.
 
Builder: Brest shipyard
Begun: May 1801
Launched: Never launched
Completed: -
Fate: Cancelled, February 1804.

Small Variant (Pluton group – 24 ships launched) 

Starting with the prototypes Pluton and Borée in 1803, a smaller version of the Téméraire class, officially named petit modèle, was designed by Jacques-Noël Sané to be produced in shipyards having a lesser depth of water than the principal French shipyards, primarily those in neighbouring states under French control and in foreign ports which had been absorbed into the French Empire such as Antwerp. The revised design measured 177 feet 7 inches on the waterline, 180 feet 1 inch on the deck, and 46 feet 11 inches moulded breadth.  The depth of hull was 9 inches less than that in the "regular" Téméraire design.
 
Builder: Toulon shipyard
Ordered: June 1803
Laid down: August 1803
Launched: 17 January 1805
Completed: March 1805.
Fate: Captured by the Spanish at Cadiz in June 1808.
 
Builder: Toulon shipyard
Ordered: June 1803
Laid down: August 1803
Launched: 27 June 1805
Completed: August 1805
Fate: Condemned at Toulon in 1827.
 Two more 74s to the "petit modèle" design were ordered in June 1803, one at Marseille and the other at Bordeaux, but these were not built.
 
Builder: Genoa shipyard
Ordered:
Laid down: July 1803
Launched: 17 August 1805
Completed: November 1805
Fate: Condemned at Rochefort in August 1821, and broken up there by October 1821.
 
Builder: Flushing shipyard
Ordered:
Launched:
Fate: Captured on the stocks after the fall of Flushing during the Walcheren Campaign in 1809.
 
Builder: Antwerp shipyard
Ordered:
Laid down: November 1803
Launched: 9 April 1807
Completed: March 1808
Fate: Condemned at Brest in February 1819, and broken up there in December 1819.
 
Builder: Antwerp shipyard
Ordered:
Laid down: April 1804
Launched: 8 April 1807
Completed: March 1808
Fate: Ceded to the new Dutch Navy, 1 August 1814, renamed Nassau.
 , renamed Éole in August 1814, then Anversois in March 1815 and back to Éole in July 1815.
Builder: Antwerp shipyard
Ordered:
Laid down: June 1804
Launched: 7 June 1807
Completed: March 1808
Fate: Condemned at Brest in February 1819 and broken up there in December 1819.
 
Builder: Antwerp shipyard
Ordered:
Laid down: July 1804
Launched: 20 June 1807
Completed: March 1808
Fate: Condemned at Lorient in June 1818, and broken up there in January 1820.
 
Builder: Antwerp shipyard
Ordered:
Launched: 21 June 1807
Fate: Became Dutch Prins Frederik in 1814, broken up 1821
 , renamed Thésée before launch, renamed Atlas after 1814.
Builder: Antwerp shipyard
Ordered:
Launched: 6 September 1807
Fate: Condemned 1819, hulked.
 , originally Audacieux, renamed before launch.
Builder: Antwerp shipyard
Ordered:
Launched: 20 September 1807
Fate:Ceded to Holland 1814, broken up 1817
 , named Illustre before launching, and renamed Achille in 1814 during the First Restoration. In 1815, during the Hundred Days, reverted to Dantzig, but returned to Achille on the Second Restoration.
Builder: Antwerp shipyard
Ordered:
Launched: 15 August 1807
Fate: Struck, 1816.
 
Builder: Antwerp shipyard
Ordered:
Begun: April 1807
Launched: 2 October 1808
Completed: April 1809
Fate: Struck, 1814.
  (originally named Superbe, but renamed before launching)
Builder: Genoa shipyard
Ordered: January 1806
Launched: 3 May 1808
Completed: August 1808
Fate: Struck, 1836.
 , renamed Hector in 1814 during the First Restoration. In 1815, during the Hundred Days, reverted to Dalmate, but returned to Hector on the Second Restoration.
Builder: Antwerp shipyard
Ordered:
Begun: August 1806
Launched: 21 August 1808
Completed: April 1809
Fate: Struck, 1819.
 
Builder: Venice shipyard
Ordered:
Launched: 6 September 1810
Served as HMS Rivoli until broken up in 1819.
 
Builder: Venice shipyard
Ordered:
Launched: not launched
Fate:
 
Builder: Venice shipyard
Ordered:
Launched: 1811
Fate:  Struck, 1814.
 
Builder: Venice shipyard
Ordered:
Launched: 1811
Fate: Ceded to Austria, broken up 1831.
 
Builder: Amsterdam shipyard
Ordered:
Launched: 1815
Fate: Abandoned in 1813, completed by the United Kingdom of the Netherlands.
 
Builder: Venice shipyard
Ordered:
Launched: 1812
Fate: Struck, 1814.
 
Builder: Amsterdam shipyard
Ordered:
Launched: July 1817
Fate: Abandoned in 1813, completed by the United Kingdom of the Netherlands.
 
Builder: Venice shipyard
Ordered:
Launched: 1812
Fate: Ceded to Austria, broken up 1838.
 
Builder: Amsterdam shipyard
Ordered:
Launched: 1817
Fate: Abandoned in 1813, completed by the United Kingdom of the Netherlands.
 
Builder: Rotterdam shipyard
Ordered:
Launched: 1817
Fate: Abandoned in 1813, completed by the United Kingdom of the Netherlands.
 Montenotte
Builder: Venice shipyard
Ordered:
Launched: 1815
Fate: Completed by Lombardy–Venetia.
 Arcole
Builder: Venice shipyard
Ordered:
Launched: not launched
Fate: Cancelled.
 Lombardo
Builder: Venice shipyard
Ordered:
Launched: not launched
Fate: Cancelled.
 Semmering
Builder: Venice shipyard
Ordered:
Launched: not launched
Fate: Cancelled.
 Citoyen
Builder: Trieste shipyard
Ordered: December 1811
Launched: not launched
Fate: Cancelled, 1812.

See also 
 French ship Téméraire for a list of ships so named in the French Navy

Notes, citations, and references

Notes

Citations

References

External links

 Le Redoutable 
 La Ville de Marseille

 
74-gun ship of the line classes
Ship of the line classes from France
 
Ship classes of the French Navy